London Buses route 81 is a Transport for London contracted bus route in London, England. Running between Hounslow and Slough, it is operated by Metroline.

History
The route goes back to the 1900s. Its original course was from Hounslow to Windsor Castle. By the 1940s, the route only operated on a daily basis from Hounslow to Slough, serving Eton and Windsor only at weekends. The section from Slough to Windsor Castle was withdrawn in 1963.

The 1980s saw the introduction by London Regional Transport of route tenders, with route 81 the first route to be put out to tender. The contract for the route was awarded to Len Wright Travel, which later became London Buslines, and passed to them from London Buses on 13 July 1985.

Tendering saw the route move from Hounslow garage to Lampton (later Isleworth, then Southall) and revert to double deck, using yellow Daimler Fleetlines. These were replaced in 1987 by Leyland Lynxes. On 29 July 1995 the route was lost to Westlink and moved to Hounslow Heath garage using Optare Deltas. Westlink became part of London United Busways in September 1995. On 27 July 2019, Metroline gained the contract for the route.

Current route
Route 81 operates via these primary locations:
Hounslow  High Street, School Road
Treaty Centre
Hounslow West station 
Cranford
Harlington Corner
Heathrow Airport North
Longford
Colnbrook High Street
Langley London Road
Slough bus station for Slough station

References

External links

Timetable

Bus routes in London
Transport in the London Borough of Hillingdon
Transport in the London Borough of Hounslow
Transport in Slough
81